Lemelson may refer to:

 Jerome H. Lemelson (1923–1997), American inventor and founder of the Lemelson Foundation
 the Lemelson–MIT Prize, which he endowed in 1994
 Emmanuel Lemelson (born 1976), Greek Orthodox priest and hedge fund manager
 Lemelson Capital Management, the investment management firm which he founded